Alexandria Real Estate Equities, Inc. is a real estate investment trust based in Pasadena, California that invests in office buildings and laboratories leased to tenants in the life science and technology industries.

The company also has a venture capital arm, Alexandria Venture Investments, which invests in life sciences firms.

The company is named after Alexandria, Egypt because of that city's connection to science.

Investments
As of December 31, 2022, the company owned or had investments in 41.7 million square feet of operating properties in addition to properties under construction.

The company's largest tenants are as follows:

The company's revenues are derived in the following markets:

Properties are generally located near universities to attract tenants. The company has several properties in Kendall Square in Cambridge, Massachusetts, where it has invested over $2.3 billion since its first investment in the neighborhood in 2002. Its largest campuses in Boston are the 2,365,487 square foot Alexandria Center at Kendall Square and the 1,181,635 square foot Technology Square (Cambridge, Massachusetts).

The company's 740,972 square foot Alexandria Center for Life Science in Manhattan has several biotechnology tenants.

The company's San Diego properties are primarily in Torrey Pines, San Diego, University City, San Diego, and Sorrento Mesa, San Diego.

History
In 1993, one of the partners of Jacobs Engineering Group, Jerry M. Sudarsky, was presented with a Business Plan written by Kendell R. Lang titled BioProperties Management Group, Inc., which was a plan to form a REIT dedicated to funding biotech properties. The initial business plan included founders Kendell Lang, Alan Gold, Gary Kreitzer, and Steven Stone as part of the initial management team. Jacobs approached Joel S. Marcus, a lawyer and CPA, with the idea of representing their interests in this company to oversee the management team who intended to provide laboratories and office space to biotech firms. Jacobs invested in the company with $5 million.

Its first purchase was of 4 buildings in San Diego which had been negotiated and structured by Kendell R. Lang.

In 1997, it became a public company via an initial public offering, raising $155 million.

In October 2002, the company acquired the headquarters of ZymoGenetics for $52 million in a leaseback transaction.

In 2007, the company began development of the West Tower of the MaRS Discovery District in Toronto. The company stopped construction during the financial crisis of 2007-08, and in 2014, it sold its interest to the Government of Ontario for $65 million.

In January 2013, the company sold a research facility in Seattle to Trammell Crow Company for $42.6 million.

In June 2018, the company acquired an office building leased to Amazon.com in Seattle from The Blackstone Group for $95 million.

In July 2018, the company acquired 219 East 42nd Street, the headquarters of Pfizer, for $203 million in a leaseback transaction.

References

External links

1997 initial public offerings
Companies based in Pasadena, California
Companies listed on the New York Stock Exchange
Financial services companies established in 1994
Real estate companies established in 1994
Real estate investment trusts of the United States